Joanna Cynthia Berry (born 1957) is a British peace activist and public speaker. She is the daughter of the Hon. Sir Anthony Berry, who was killed by the IRA in the Brighton hotel bombing on 12 October 1984. The bomb was planted by Patrick Magee, whom Berry publicly met in November 2000 in  an effort at achieving reconciliation as envisioned in the wake of the Good Friday Agreement.

Berry lives in Somerset, England. Through her mother, she is a first cousin of Diana, Princess of Wales.

Reconciliation 

After her father died, she committed her life to peaceful resolution and mediation of conflict. After the release of Patrick Magee in 1999 she went on to meet him several times. These meetings over ten months formed the basis of a BBC documentary first broadcast on 13 December 2001.

In July 2003 Berry spoke at St Ethelburga's Centre for Reconciliation and Peace, St Ethelburga’s church itself rebuilt after being destroyed by the IRA in the 1993 Bishopsgate bombing. Her reconciliation work has been featured in the film Beyond Right and Wrong (film).

Recent work 
Berry founded the charity Building Bridges for Peace on the 18 October 2009.

On Monday 21 March 2011, Berry spoke at the Peace One Day conference in London and on Wednesday 12 May 2011, she spoke on a panel with Patrick Magee, Archbishop Desmond Tutu and Mary Kayitesi Blewitt, who lost over 50 members of her family in the Rwandan genocide.

Berry is an established speaker, and has also appeared together with Pat Magee on over 300 occasions, most recently in Rwanda, Lebanon and Israel and Palestine as well as locally in Belfast.

References

External links 
  Building Bridges for Peace website

1957 births
Living people
British anti-war activists
People from Somerset
British twins
British women activists
Jo